Baek, also often spelled Paek, Baik, or Paik is a Korean family name.  In the year 2000, there were 351,275 people with this surname in South Korea. The word means the color white.

Baek (白)
"白" has a Cantonese origin from the Yuan dynasty and Goryeo dynasty.
Baek Wu Kyung (白宇經) of the Suwon Baek clan, cousin of Bai Juyi of the Tang Dynasty, is the origin of this name.

Baek (苩)
Some Baekje refugees from the late Silla age had this surname.
Paik Ga (苩加), Mahan ruler
Paik Yong (苩龍), Silla general
Paik Ki (苩奇), Baekje general
Paik Ga (苩加), Baekje painter

List of famous Baeks
Baek
Baek A-yeon, South Korean singer and songwriter
Cha-seung Baek, Korean-American former professional baseball pitcher
Baek Doo San, fictional character in Tekken fighting games
Baek Ji-hoon, South Korean football player
Baek Ji-young, South Korean singer
Baek Jin-hee, South Korean actress
Baek Minseok, South Korean writer
Baek Sung-hyun, South Korean actor
Baek Ye-rin, South Korean singer-songwriter and former member of duo 15&
Baek Jong-won, South Korean chef
Baek I-Jin, Fictional character in "Twenty Five Twenty One"

Baik
Baik Sou Linne, South Korean author

Paek
Paek Hak-rim (1918–2006), North Korean politician
Jim Paek, Korean-born Canadian former professional ice hockey player and current coach for the South Korean national team
Paek Nam-il, North Korean politician
Paek Nam-nyong, North Korean writer
Paek Nam-sun (1929–2007), North Korean politician and Minister of Foreign Affairs
Paek Sang-ho, North Korean Colonel General
Paek Se-bong, North Korean politician
Paek Yong-ho, North Korean politician

Paik
Paik Gahuim, South Korean writer
Kun-Woo Paik, South Korean pianist
Nam June Paik (1932–2006), Korean American artist
Paik Seung-ho, South Korean professional footballer
Paik Sun-yup (1920–2020), South Korean military officer
Paik Sun-Hwa, fictional character on television series Lost

See also
Suwon Baek clan
Baek clan
Pai (Chinese surname)

Korean-language surnames